Herbert Sturhahn (July 29, 1902 – January 10, 1979) was an American football player.  He was elected to the College Football Hall of Fame in 1981.

1902 births
1979 deaths
American football guards
College Football Hall of Fame inductees
Yale Bulldogs football players
People from Far Rockaway, Queens